Peoples Bank is a $300 million community bank based in Mendenhall, Mississippi.  Brick and mortar branches are located in Collins, Magee, Mendenhall and Richland in addition to ITM/ATM services in Puckett and New Hebron. Peoples Bank operates under a parent company Peoples Bancshares, Inc. and is affiliated with Peoples Bank Mortgage, based in North Charleston, South Carolina and Main Street Realty, based in Magee, Mississippi.

Peoples Bank is a community development financial institution (CDFI).  This means that the  financial institution provides credit and financial services to underserved markets and populations.

Peoples Bank offers all types of lending and is a designated Preferred Lender with the U. S. Small Business Administration (SBA).

History 
Peoples Bank was founded in 1908. It was established by Colonel Sidney McLaurin and Dewitt Enoch in downtown Mendenhall, Mississippi.  It is currently run by a fourth-generation CEO.

References

External links 

Banks based in Mississippi
Community development financial institutions
Banks established in 1908
1908 establishments in Mississippi